Brazil Classics, Vol. 4: The Best of Tom Zé – Massive Hits is a compilation album by Brazilian singer-songwriter Tom Zé. This 1990 album was Tom Zé's first release on Luaka Bop after being discovered by David Byrne and was the first introduction of Zé's music to a wider U.S. audience. Music critic Robert Christgau has named it among his 10 best albums from the 1990s.

Track listing

References

1990 compilation albums
Tom Zé albums
Avant-pop albums